This is a listing of all those that have served as the mayor of the city of Sorocaba, São Paulo, Brazil.

References 

Lists of mayors of places in Brazil